Lee Yong Lepcha (born 7 November 1991) is an Indian cricketer. He made his List A debut for Sikkim in the 2018–19 Vijay Hazare Trophy on 20 September 2018. He was the leading run-scorer for Sikkim in the 2018–19 Vijay Hazare Trophy, with 214 runs in eight matches. He made his first-class debut for Sikkim in the 2018–19 Ranji Trophy on 1 November 2018. He made his Twenty20 debut for Sikkim in the 2018–19 Syed Mushtaq Ali Trophy on 21 February 2019.

References

External links
 

1991 births
Living people
Indian cricketers
Sikkim cricketers
Place of birth missing (living people)